The 1949 Ole Miss Rebels football team was an American football team that represented the University of Mississippi as a member of the Southeastern Conference (SEC) during the 1949 college football season. In their third year under head coach Johnny Vaught, the team compiled an overall record of 4–5–1, with a mark of 2–4 in conference play, placing ninth in the SEC.

Schedule

Roster

References

Ole Miss
Ole Miss Rebels football seasons
Ole Miss Rebels football